Salarama was a town of ancient Lycaonia, inhabited in Roman and Byzantine times. 

Its site is located near Zincirli Han, Asiatic Turkey.

References

Populated places in ancient Lycaonia
Former populated places in Turkey
Roman towns and cities in Turkey
Populated places of the Byzantine Empire
History of Konya Province